Back on Track is a studio album by Scottish singer Lulu, released 7 March 2004 as a digital download and 15 March 2004 on CD. The album includes the songs "All the Love in the World" and "Keep Talkin' I'm Listening", which were seriously considered as singles (promotional  music videos for both were made in advance), but never made it to a single release, as well a new recording of her 2000 single "Where the Poor Boys Dance". With no new single to promote this album, it stalled at no.68 on the UK Albums Chart, despite positive reviews , a tour, and many guest slots from Lulu on television and radio chat shows.

Track listing

Release history

References

2004 albums
Lulu (singer) albums
Mercury Records albums